Wissem Hmam (born 21 April 1981) is a Tunisian handball player. Hmam was ranked as the top scorer in the 2005 World Championship, scoring a total of 81 goals and helping Tunisia reach the semifinals in the 2005 World Men's Handball Championship in Tunis.

References

1981 births
Living people
Tunisian male handball players
Olympic handball players of Tunisia
Handball players at the 2000 Summer Olympics
Handball players at the 2012 Summer Olympics
20th-century Tunisian people
21st-century Tunisian people